The 2016 African Judo Championships were the 37th edition of the African Judo Championships, and were held in Tunis, Tunisia from 8 to 10 April 2016.

The winners qualified for the 2016 Summer Olympics.

Medals table

Medal overview

Men

60 kg

Finals

Pool A

Pool B

Pool C

Pool D

Repechage

Women

Team

Kata Events

References

External links
 
 Results.
 Official website of the 2016 African Judo Championships, Judobase.org.
 Africa Judo Union.
 Presentation at Africa Judo Union.

A
African Judo Championships
African Judo Championships, 2016
African Judo Championships